Seneca Glass Company Building, now called Seneca Center, is a historic glass factory located at Morgantown, Monongalia County, West Virginia. It was built by the Seneca Glass Company in 1896–1897, and is an industrial complex of work areas, all connected by doors, passageways, or bridges.  A fire in 1902, destroyed much of the interior of the original brick part of the complex.  After the fire, Elmer F. Jacobs designed the new two-story replacement, a new Needle Etching Room in a separate building connected by a bridge, and the reconstruction of the Grinding, Glazing, and Cutting areas. A large addition was built in 1947.  The building features a conical brick stack that projects 36 feet above the roofline of the Furnace / Blowing Room.  The complex was the home of one of the finest hand-blown, hand-cut and etched, lead glass factories in the world.  After the factory closed in 1983, it was adapted for commercial use.

It was listed on the National Register of Historic Places in 1985.

References

External links
 Seneca Center web site
 Seneca Glass Company Factory, Beechurst Avenue between Sixth & Eighth Streets, Morgantown, Monongalia, WV at the Historic American Engineering Record (HAER)

Industrial buildings and structures on the National Register of Historic Places in West Virginia
Industrial buildings completed in 1897
Buildings and structures in Morgantown, West Virginia
Historic American Engineering Record in West Virginia
National Register of Historic Places in Monongalia County, West Virginia
Defunct glassmaking companies
Shopping malls in West Virginia